Coming of Age (2002) is the debut studio album from Jude Johnstone.

Track listing

Personnel
 Jude Johnstone - vocals, piano 
 Charles Duncan - guitar, dobro, pennywhistle, accordion, programming, background vocals
 Biff Watson - acoustic guitar
 George Marinelli - electric guitar 
 Bonnie Raitt - slide guitar, background vocals 
 Mary Alice Hoepfinger - harp 
 John Willis - mandolin 
 David Mansfield - violin
 Salvador Garza - violin
 David Davidson - violin 
 Mary Ramsey - viola
 Kristin Wilkinson - string arrangements, viola 
 John Catchings - cello
 John Hobbs - piano, Fender Rhodes piano, keyboards, synthesizer 
 Dave Pomeroy - upright bass 
 Mauricio-Fritz Lewak - drums
 Shannon Forrest - drums 
 Sam Bacco - percussion 
 Joe Jenkins - background vocals
 Garth Fundis - background vocals
 Jackson Browne - background vocals
 Jennifer Warnes - background vocals
 Trisha Yearwood - background vocals
 Valerie Carter - background vocals
 Jill Knight - background vocals

References 
Liner notes from Jude Johnstone album: Coming of Age.

2002 debut albums
Albums produced by Garth Fundis